Jan Bulthuis (30 October 1750, Groningen – 29 May 1801, Amsterdam) was a Dutch draftsman and painter.

Bulthuis was the son of Claas Bulthuis and Weasley Ten Huising. As a painter he was trained by Jurriaan Andriessen and as a draftsman by Johannes Wieringa. Initially he painted landscapes. Later he began to concentrate on the signs of urban and rural sites. He was employed in his hometown of Groningen and from 1780 in Amsterdam. In 1785 he enrolled at the Stadstekenacademie (City Drawing School) where he won a gold medal. He made a series of drawings for the description of the Zaanlandsche villages of Adriaan Loosjes, which was issued. In 1794 his drawings were also included in the published 1968 Frisian "Vaderlandsche faces".

Bulthuis died on 29 May 1801 in Amsterdam at the age of 50.

References
 Bulthuis, Jan: Vaderlandsche faces or images, belonging to the present state of the United Netherlands, ed. H. Gartman, Amsterdam, 1786-1792
 Loosjes, Adriaan (propagated by Peter Adriaanszoon Loosjes) Description of Zaanlandsche villages, Haarlem, 1794
 Kalma, Jacob Jetzes Friese "Vaderlandsche faces", ed. The Tille, Leeuwarden, 1968
 Koppejan, Rita Jan Bulthuis: prolific draftsman with a gout-like system, in: Museum newspaper of the Groninger Museum, Fall 2000

1750 births
1801 deaths
Dutch male painters
18th-century Dutch painters
18th-century Dutch male artists
Painters from Groningen